Holcroft is a surname. Notable people with the surname include:

Bert Holcroft (born 1935), English rugby player, coach and writer
Charles Holcroft (disambiguation), several people
Fanny Margaretta Holcroft (1780–1844), writer
Francis Holcroft (1629?–1693), English minister
George Holcroft (1856–1951), English mine owner and baronet
Harold Holcroft (1882–1973), English railway engineer
Holcroft valve gear
Henry Holcroft (1586–1650), English politician
John Holcroft (disambiguation), several people
M. H. Holcroft (1902-1993), New Zealand essayist and novelist
Patrick Holcroft (born 1948), English soldier and banker
Peter Holcroft (1931-2009), 3rd baronet
Rosemary Charlotte Holcroft (1942-2000), South African botanical illustrator
Sam Holcroft, British playwright
Thomas Holcroft (disambiguation), several people
Holcroft Blood ( – 1707), Anglo-Irish soldier
Phoebe Holcroft Watson (1898-1980), British tennis player

Fictional characters
Mudie Holcroft, a fictional character from Mobile Suit Gundam SEED C.E. 73: Stargazer

See also
Holcroft baronets
Mount Holcroft, Canada
The Holcroft Covenant, a 1978 novel by Robert Ludlum
The Holcroft Covenant (film), a 1985 thriller